11 Paoni - Coptic calendar - 13 Paoni

Fixed commemorations
All fixed commemorations below are observed on 12 Paoni (19 June) by the Coptic Orthodox Church.

Saints
Departure of Pope Justus of Alexandria (135 A.D.)
Departure of Pope Cyril II of Alexandria (808 A.M.), (1092 A.D.)
Departure of Saint Euphemia the Widow

Commemorations
Commemoration of Archangel Michael

References
Coptic Synexarion

Days of the Coptic calendar